Gabriela Grzywińska (born 18 February 1996) is a Polish footballer who plays as a midfielder for Russian Club Zenit and has appeared for the Poland women's national team.

Career
Grzywińska has been capped for the Poland national team, appearing for the team during the 2019 FIFA Women's World Cup qualifying cycle.

References

External links
 
 
 

1996 births
Living people
Polish women's footballers
Women's association football midfielders
Medyk Konin players
Poland women's international footballers
Polish expatriate footballers
Polish expatriate sportspeople in Russia
Expatriate women's footballers in Russia